Grigny is a commune in the Metropolis of Lyon in Auvergne-Rhône-Alpes region in eastern France.

History 
Grigny became of a member of the Urban Community of Lyon in 2007. On 1 January 2015 Grigny left the department of Rhône to join the Metropolis of Lyon.

Population

See also
Communes of the Metropolis of Lyon

References

Communes of Lyon Metropolis
Lyonnais